The Latvian Legion was a formation of the German Waffen-SS during World War II. Created in 1943, it consisted primarily of ethnic Latvian personnel. The legion consisted of two divisions of the Waffen-SS: the 15th Waffen Grenadier Division of the SS (1st Latvian), and the 19th Waffen Grenadier Division of the SS (2nd Latvian). The 15th Division was administratively subordinated to the VI SS Corps, but operationally it was in reserve or at the disposal of the XXXXIII Army Corps, 16th Army, Army Group North. The 19th Division held out in the Courland Pocket until May 1945, the close of World War II, when it was among the last of Nazi Germany's forces to surrender.

Creation 

The Latvian Legion was created in January 1943 on the orders of Adolf Hitler following a request by Heinrich Himmler, the head of the SS. The initial core of the force was populated by Latvian Police Battalions, which were formed starting in 1941 earlier for security duties and already serving on the Eastern Front under Wehrmacht command. While members of Holocaust collaborator Arajs Kommando were subsequently joined to the Legion, this was late in the war as the Kommando was demobilized from anti-partisan and anti-Jewish action, with the first former Arajs unit attached to the Legion in December, 1944.

Under the Rosenberg labor decree of December 1941, the Germans had already begun conscripting Latvians in early 1942, giving them a choice of joining the labor service or police battalions. One month after the unit was founded, German occupation authorities in Latvia started conscripting military age men specifically for the Legion. Draftees were given a choice between serving in the Wehrmacht-subordinated Waffen-SS Legion, serving as German Wehrmacht auxiliaries, or being sent to a slave labor camp in Germany. Those who tried to avoid one of those options were arrested and sent to concentration camps. As a result, only 15-20% of the men serving in the legion were actual volunteers. Unlike in Lithuania, potential legionary recruits in Latvia did not organize an official boycott of conscription; some Latvians deserted however rather than serving the Nazi war effort.

With Nazi Germany losing the war, conscription was extended to larger and larger numbers of Latvians. The first conscription, in 1943, applied to all Latvian men born from 1919 to 1924. Subsequent conscriptions eventually extended to Latvians born between 1906 and 1928. The division commanders and most of the staff were German SS officers. The individual combat regiments were typically commanded by Latvian officers.

After the Red Army broke through German lines at Nevel along the 1st Baltic Front in November 1943, advancing on Latvia, the Latvian Self-Administration took over mobilization from the Germans on November 13. By June 26 there were 7,671 ethnic Russians from Latvia's Latgale, representing ten percent of men from the region, serving in various units of the Latvian Legion. On July 1, 1944, the Latvian Legion had 87,550 men. Another 23,000 Latvians were serving as Wehrmacht "auxiliaries".

Operational history 
The first Latvian Legion unit was the 2nd Latvian SS Brigade, created in February 1943. It fought its first battle in the Siege of Leningrad, opposite the Pulkovo observatory on 18 March 1943. It continued fighting around Leningrad until the German forces retreated in January 1944.

The 15th Waffen-SS Division was formed and sent to the front in November 1943. Originally, it was sent to the Ostrov and Novosokolniki districts of Pskov Oblast, but after the German Army suffered setbacks there, was moved to positions in the Belebelka district of Novgorod Oblast in January 1944. It retreated from there a month later. At the end of February 1944, both units took joint defensive positions on the Sorota and Velikaya rivers. At that time, the 2nd Brigade was renamed the 19th Waffen-SS division. Over the next two months, these positions saw intense fighting.

In April 1944, the Legion was replaced by other units and moved to less active positions in Bardovo-Kudever, 50 km east of Opochka. It came under attack there in June 1944 and started to retreat on July 10, 1944, crossing the Latvian-Russian border on July 17.

In August and September 1944, the 15th Division was moved to Prussia, for replenishment with new recruits. It was in training near Danzig until being ordered into battle on 22 January 1945. At that time, the division consisted of about 15,000 soldiers. It fought near Danzig in January and February, retreating to Pomerania in early March. By early April, the division was reduced to 8,000 men. About 1,000 were sent by sea to replenish the forces in the Courland Pocket, the rest were lost during the fighting. On April 11, the division was told about plans to transfer the entire division to Courland. Seeing that the war was lost and understanding that being sent to Courland would mean eventually having to surrender to the Soviets, the division decided to surrender to the Western Allies instead, disobeying German orders to the contrary, when necessary.

The 19th Division continued to fight in Latvia. In October 1944, Soviet advances in Lithuania cut off it and other units in the Courland Pocket from the rest of the German forces. It was a part of the six battles between Soviet and German armies in the Courland Pocket in 1944 and 1945. During the third battle in December 1944, the opposing Soviet units included two Latvian divisions, the 43rd and the 308th, formed from recruits drafted in Soviet-occupied Eastern Latvia. When the Latvian units on both sides of the front faced one another, they were quite unwilling and occasionally disengaged without firing a shot. The Soviet command would transfer the Latvian divisions elsewhere after a few days. Together with other units in the Courland Pocket, the 19th division surrendered to the Soviets at the end of the war on May 9, 1945. Subsequently, almost 50,000 Latvian soldiers became Soviet prisoners of war, imprisoned in filtration or Gulag camps. Some of the Legion soldiers continued fighting the Soviets as Forest Brothers for up to ten years after the end of the war.

Motivation of Latvian Legionnaires 
 Oberführer Adolf Ax, commander of the 15th Division, reported on 27 January 1945: "They are first and foremost Latvians.  They want a sustainable Latvian nation state.  Forced to choose between Germany and Russia, they have chosen Germany, because they seek co-operation with western civilization.  The rule of the Germans seems to them to be the lesser of two evils." This perspective resulted in part from the Soviet occupation between 1940 and 1941, called "The Year of Terror" during which tens of thousands of Latvian families were executed or deported to Siberia with men separated from the women and children to break down resistance.

Legion command emphasized that the Latvians were fighting against Soviet re-occupation. Conscripts promised in the name of God to be subservient to the German military and its commander Adolf Hitler, to be courageous and to be prepared to give up their life "in the fight against Bolshevism". Legionnaires hoped to fight off the Red Army until it was no longer a threat to Latvia and then turn against Nazi Germany, as a repeat of the Latvian War of Independence of 1918–1920, when Latvian forces expelled both Bolshevik and German forces. Legionnaires carried Latvian flags under their uniforms as a symbol of that hope. This sentiment was also reflected in one of the most popular Legion songs that went: "We'll beat those lice-infested ones – again, again. After that we'll trounce those blue-grays – again, again" (with euphemisms for Bolsheviks and Germans). The Allies confirmed this as early as 1943, when a British investigative mission found Latvians stood against both their Soviet and German occupiers.

Latvians, as did the Estonians and to lesser degree Lithuanians, believed that the Western powers, especially Britain, would come to their aid as they had in 1918–1920. These hopes were bolstered by Allied communications received in November 1944 in which British command instructed them to hold Courland until a joint British-American fleet entered the Baltic. In fact, Churchill and Roosevelt had already privately consigned the Baltics to Stalin.

Known Holocaust collaborator police battalion units such as Arājs Kommando were joined to the Legion late in the war as conditions deteriorated on the Eastern Front. That circumstance has been used to accuse the entire Legion of anti-Semitism, Nazi sympathies, and Holocaust war crimes—and modern Latvians commemorating the Latvian Legion of glorifying Nazis.

After World War II 

In 1946, the Nuremberg Tribunal declared the Waffen-SS to be a criminal organization, making an exception of people who had been forcibly conscripted. The Nuremberg tribunal ruled that those who had served in the Baltic Legions were conscripts, not volunteers, and defined them as freedom fighters protecting their homelands from a Soviet occupation and as such they were not true members of the criminal Waffen SS.

Subsequently, on 13 April 1950, a message from the Allied High Commission (HICOG), signed by John J. McCloy to the Secretary of State, clarified the US position on the Baltic Legions: "they were not to be seen as 'movements', 'volunteer', or 'SS'. In short, they had not been given the training, indoctrination, and induction normally given to SS members".

With the full support of Nuremberg and Allied High Commission, the US Displaced Persons Commission declared in September 1950 that: 
"The Baltic Waffen SS Units (Baltic Legions) are to be considered as separate and distinct in purpose, ideology, activities, and qualifications for membership from the German SS, and therefore the Commission holds them not to be a movement hostile to the government of the United States."

Even before this decision, around 1,000 former Latvian Legion soldiers had served as guards at the Nuremberg trials, guarding Nazi war criminals. Afterwards, during the Berlin Blockade, they took part in securing Allied facilities involved in the Berlin Airlift and later also were guarding USA Army headquarters.

During the Soviet period, the Latvian Legion were described as having been illegally conscripted by Nazi Germany in 1943, with no indication of being war criminals or of Holocaust involvement. For example, the Soviet film I remember everything, Richard (also known as Rock and Splinters in its uncut release) made during the 1960s (during the Cold War) at the Riga Film Studio, while being full of Soviet propaganda clichés, clearly illustrates recognition of several essential aspects with respect to Legion soldiers, amongst those: that they were front-line soldiers, they were mostly forcefully conscripted, they were not supporters of Nazi ideology, they did not take part in the Holocaust.  This contrasts sharply with Russia's post-Soviet stance, which denounces the Legion as Waffen SS war criminals and uses the Legion issue to assert political and ideological pressure on Latvia on the international scene.

In 1946 the coalition government of Sweden led by the Social Democrats, despite strong protests from many sectors of Swedish society, extradited soldiers from the Latvian Legion (also some Estonian Legion and Lithuanian soldiers) who had fled to Sweden and were interned there to the USSR in an event that became known as Baltutlämningen. In the 1990s the Swedish government admitted that this had been a mistake. Surviving Baltic veterans were invited to Sweden in 1994, where they were met by the King of Sweden Carl XVI Gustaf and the Minister for Foreign Affairs of Sweden Margaretha af Ugglas and participated in various ceremonies commemorating the events surrounding their extradition. Both the King and the Minister for Foreign affairs expressed their regret for Sweden's past extradition of Baltic Legion soldiers to the Stalinist USSR.

Although the position of the defenders of Latvian Legion is quite widespread, some scholars stress that there are grounds for supposing that the Latvian Legion possesses all the features of a criminal organization specified at the Nuremberg trials: the conscription procedure into the Legion had certain peculiarities, which do not allow to definitively speak of its compulsory character.

Allegations of war crimes 

The participation of some members of the legion in The Holocaust, including 600 were also members of the Arajs Kommando, and the legion's inclusion of members of the Latvian fascist movement Pērkonkrusts,
and Holocaust participants,  has led to accusations that, under international military law, the legion met the criteria for a criminal organisation and/or that a significant proportion of its members, were directly or indirectly involved in war crimes. It has also been claimed that soldiers of the legion were involved in a massacre of Polish POWs at Podgaje, in 1945. Even though the Nuremberg Tribunal excluded Latvian Waffen SS units from the list of criminal organisations, scholars such as Leanid Kazyrytski have argued that the Latvian Legion does possess all the features of a criminal organisation, as defined by the Tribunal. 

Other scholars and researchers, such as the Finnish journalist Jukka Rislakki, in his 2008 book The Case for Latvia: Disinformation Campaigns Against a Small Nation has dismissed descriptions of the legion as a criminal organisation. Rislakki has described it as an example of "guilt by association".

Remembrance Day of the Latvian Legionnaires 

In the years after the war, 16 March was chosen by the Latvian Legion veterans' organisation in Western exile, as the day of the Latvian Legion, to commemorate a battle on the eastern shore of the Velikaya River for Hill "93,4", fought by both 15th and the 19th Waffen-SS divisions. In 1990, Legion veterans started commemorating March 16 in Latvia. In 1998 Latvia's Saeima (parliament) voted this to be an official national remembrance day. The word "Legion" was, however, excluded from the remembrance day's name, in order to include all those who fought against the Soviets, both during World War II, and as resistance fighters afterwards. International pressure forced the Saeima to remove March 16 from the list of "State remembrance days" in 2000.

March 16 events have been quite confrontational in recent years, with Latvian nationalist organizations (such as the National Alliance and National Power Unity) marching in support of the Latvian Legion, and predominantly-Russian organizations (Latvian Russian Union) holding protests and attempting to block the marches. Due to a particularly harsh controversy around the official commemoration of the Remembrance Day of the Latvian Legionnaires in 1998, the Latvian officials refrain from its official honoring. Currently, the official position of Latvian authorities is that the Day is a primarily private business of the veterans and their relatives.

On 21 February 2012 The Council of Europe's Commission against Racism and Intolerance published its report on Latvia (fourth monitoring cycle), in which it condemned commemorations of persons who fought in the Waffen SS and collaborated with the Nazis. ECRI expressed concerns as regards to the authorisation of a gathering, commemorating soldiers who had fought in a Latvian unit of the Waffen SS, that takes place every year on 16 March and is held in the centre of Riga, and expressed dismay at the authorisation by the competent courts of an event set to celebrate the Nazi occupation of Riga (on 1 July). It also expressed concern, that the former Minister of Foreign Affairs had not condemned the march, and on the contrary, supported it. ECRI recommended, that “the Latvian authorities condemn all attempts to  commemorate persons who fought in the Waffen SS and collaborated with the Nazis. ECRI further recommends that the authorities ban any gathering or march legitimising in any way Nazism.” On 13 March 2014, UK Labour MEP Richard Howitt, a spokesperson for the European Parliament Human Rights Sub-Committee issued a statement that included the view that "Whether local boys were forced to don the SS uniforms or were eager volunteers, celebration of their actions not only insults the memory of the victims but also honours Nazism itself." On his own website, MEP Richard Howitt, citing the Waffen SS marches, criticized the Conservative Party for its alliance with nationalist elements in the Latvian government.

See also
Declaration on Latvian Legionnaires in World War II
Estonian Legion
I Remember Everything, Richard, film
Luftwaffen-Legion Lettland

References

Further reading

 
Military units and formations of the Waffen-SS
Military history of Latvia during World War II
Foreign conscript units of the Waffen-SS
Military units and formations established in 1943
Military units and formations disestablished in 1945
Generalbezirk Lettland